Majid Jahanpour is a former Iranian Football player and coach who played for Rah Ahan and Sepidrood Rasht. Jahanpour currently coaches club S.C. Damash

References

1948 births
Living people
People from Rasht
Iranian footballers
Iran national football team managers
Damash Gilan managers
Iranian football managers
Association footballers not categorized by position
Sportspeople from Gilan province